In the sport of cricket, sledging is the practice of deliberately insulting or verbally intimidating an opposing player. The purpose is to try to weaken the opponent's concentration, thereby causing them to underperform or be more prone to error. It can be effective because the batsman stands well within hearing range of the bowler and certain close fielders, and vice versa. The insults may be direct or may feature in conversations among fielders which are intended to be overheard by the batsman. The term has also been used in other sports, as when the tennis player Nick Kyrgios insulted his opponent, Stan Wawrinka, by referring to a purported encounter between another player and the latter's girlfriend.

There is debate in the cricketing world as to whether sledging constitutes deliberately poor sportsmanship or is simply good-humoured banter. Sledging is sometimes interpreted as abuse, and it is widely acknowledged some comments aimed as sledges do sometimes cross the line into personal abuse.

Sledging can sometimes be a humorous attempt at distraction. Former Australian captain Steve Waugh referred to the practice as one of "mental disintegration".

Origin

Australian newspapers acknowledged "sledging" as a term in the mid-1970s. Despite the relatively recent coining of the term, the practice is as old as cricket itself, with historical accounts of witty banter between players being quite common. W. G. Grace and his brother E. M. were noted throughout their careers for being "noisy and boisterous" on the field. W. G. admitted that they used to "chaff" (i.e., tease) opponents, and this is seen as part of the gamesmanship for which E. M. and W. G. were always controversial.

According to Ian Chappell, the use of "sledging" as a term originated at Adelaide Oval in either the 1963–1964 or 1964–1965 Sheffield Shield competition. Chappell claims that a cricketer who swore in the presence of a woman was said to have reacted to an incident "like a sledgehammer". As a result, the direction of insults or obscenities at opponents became known as "sledging".

According to the BBC's Pat Murphy: "My understanding is that it came from the mid-sixties and a guy called Grahame Corling, who used to open the bowling for New South Wales and Australia … apparently the suggestion was that this guy's wife was [having an affair] with another team-mate, and when he came into bat [the fielding team] started singing When a Man Loves A Woman, the old Percy Sledge number."

The 1974–75 Australians were labelled the Ugly Australians for their hard-nosed cricket, verbal abuse and hostile fast bowling. "Behind the batsmen, Rod Marsh and his captain Ian Chappell would vie with each other in profanity", and Tom Graveney wrote "It was an open secret that he used to encourage his players to give a lot of verbal abuse to rival batsman when they were at the wicket in an attempt to break their concentration."

West Indian batsman Viv Richards was notorious for punishing bowlers that dared to sledge him. So much so, that many opposing captains banned their players from the practice. However, in a county game against Glamorgan, Greg Thomas attempted to sledge him after he had played and missed at several balls in a row. He informed Richards: "It's red, round and weighs about five ounces, in case you were wondering." Richards hammered the next delivery out of the cricket ground and into the nearby River Taff. Turning to the bowler, he commented: "Greg, you know what it looks like, now go and find it."

International views

Australia 
It has been pointed out (for example in the Sydney Morning Herald) that the Australian cricket team believes in playing in a more "robust" fashion than others and that it upholds a "sledging culture". As per Australian cricketer Mark Taylor, Australian fans want to watch "combative cricket". Australian batsman Ricky Ponting has argued that sledging helps get players "out of control" and "out of their comfort zone". Ponting has also said that it's "not as bad" as the average person would think. Australian all-rounder Michael Clarke has said that he "loved the aggressive approach". In response to "personal sledging" accusations against his team, Australian cricketer Steve Smith has said, "Getting personal on the field is not on, that's crossing the line in my opinion." By contrast, Australian opener Ed Cowan suggests that "all sledging is personal" adding that Australian cricketers should be "nowhere near the line".

Before the controversial Test series during Australia's Tour of South Africa in 2018 commenced, Australian spinner Nathan Lyon commented on sledging: "We know where the line is. We headbutt it, but we don’t go over it." Following the 2018 Australian ball-tampering scandal, voices calling for a reformation of Australia's 'cricket culture' have emerged. Australian Prime Minister Malcolm Turnbull called for an end to sledging following the scandal. Following the outrage over the scandal, former Australian cricketer Justin Langer said that cricket would be 'dull' without sledging. Australian batsman David Warner who received a one-year ban following the controversial series, exclaimed: "I play with aggression on the field and I try not to cross that line". Former Australian cricketer and former coach of the Australian team Darren Lehmann has suggested that Australia is 'not as bad' as portrayed, adding that sledging was worse during his own times. Australian wicketkeeper Tim Paine, in captaincy as replacement for Steve Smith who received a one-year ban from the 2018 Australian ball-tampering scandal, said that his team will 'stay on the side of banter and never go to abuse.'

Australian cricketer Chris Lynn suggests that franchise cricket has helped reduce sledging as players tend to end up being in the same team. According to former Australian cricketer Mike Whitney, sledging is part of the game as long as it's not 'personal'. During India's Tour of Australia in 2018-19, Australian cricketers were 'scared' to sledge Indian Test captain Virat Kohli and 'sucked up' to him for lucrative IPL contracts, according to Michael Clarke.

In August 2019, Cricket Australia CEO Kevin Roberts announced that they will be updating the board's anti-discrimination code to add penalties including life bans for on-field slurs related to sexuality as part of its policy for 'inclusion of transgender and gender diverse players in elite cricket'. This was met with harsh criticism by Australian Prime Minister Scott Morrison who called the policy a 'sledgehammer'.

Bangladesh 
Historically described as a 'timid' side, Bangladesh underwent a transformation as they grew in confidence following the 2015 Cricket World Cup, according to Bangladeshi cricketer Mashrafe Mortaza. Mortaza says that he encourages his players to 'look the opponent in the eye' while 'not overstepping a line'. He also insists that his side 'does not start a conversation' on the field. Bangladesh former cricketer and commentator Athar Ali Khan says that Bangladesh has moved out of a 'culture of backing off'.

England 
England coach Trevor Bayliss expressed disapproval over sledging being caught on the stump mics, suggesting that sledging must be censored on television as it isn't a 'great thing for young kids at home watching'. In contrast with Bayliss, England cricketer Moeen Ali suggests stump mics should be turned up, in order to deter players from sledging.

Former English cricketer Bob Willis has suggested that sledging of a 'personal nature' should be reported to the match referee, with particular reference to Australian sledging directed at English players during the 2017-18 Ashes. Before England's Tour of New Zealand in 2018, former English cricketer Geoffrey Boycott called for English cricketers to 'drop' sledging. England wicketkeeper Jonny Bairstow has expressed a need for greater clarity with regard to what is deemed as 'personal', pointing out that there are so many grey areas around the 'line'.

India 

Former Indian captain Kapil Dev laid the foundation to turn India into a competitive sledging side, according to Viv Richards. Saurav Ganguly is known to be among India's first 'aggressive' captains who employed sledging on the field. Indian batsman Virender Sehwag has said, "If there's no sledging, there won't be any enjoyment left in the game." Indian cricketer Gautam Gambhir said it's fine to do 'whatever you can to upset the opposition till the time you don't get personal.' Indian wicketkeeper MS Dhoni has described sledging as an 'art' and has said it is fair as long as a 'line' isn't crossed. Indian pacer Sreesanth has said that sledging is 'part and parcel' of the game. Indian bowler Irfan Pathan has said that sledging has a 'certain charm' about it also adding that it should be done 'within limits'. Indian legend Sachin Tendulkar has called for sledging within 'certain limits' in his autobiography Playing It My Way. Former Indian cricketer and commentator Sunil Gavaskar explains that sledging is done to 'disrupt a cricketer's concentration'. Former Indian cricketer Mohammad Kaif has stated that sledging is fine but verbals must not extend to 'family'.

Indian cricket captain Virat Kohli said, "We take it very well and we give it back even better." Ganguly has stated that Kohli's aggression is 'two-times more' than his own. Under Kohli's captaincy, players are required to have 'top fitness, high intensity and an aggressive mindset'. Upon receiving the ICC Spirit of Cricket Award in January 2020, India captain Virat Kohli talked in support of sledging, on-field banter and intimidation adding that individuals should not be targeted 'emotionally'. Sachin Tendulkar has pointed out that aggression has become the strength of the Indian team under Kohli. Indian Test cricketer Cheteshwar Pujara said that he makes 'a lot of noise on the field' and believes that sledging 'helps the bowlers'. Indian batsman Ajinkya Rahane has compared sledging (on the cricket field) to 'car honking while driving'. Defending sledging objections against Virat Kohli and Rishabh Pant by Australian cricketers during India's Tour of Australia in 2018, former Indian batsman VVS Laxman said, "When you're playing for your country you have to play with pride, you have to play with passion."

New Zealand 
Former New Zealand cricketer Adam Parore admitted to cringing when reflecting upon sledging in his own times and exclaimed that he hadn't heard the word 'humble' before 2009. Former New Zealand captain Stephen Fleming said that sledging wasn't 'always pretty' but that he was ready to take any 'advantage' for the team. New Zealand's attitude under Fleming, particularly against South Africa, has reportedly been 'nasty'. In a bid to reconnect with fans, Brendon McCullum transformed the New Zealand team into a much friendlier cricketing opposition upon taking captaincy, doing away with all sledging. McCullum said that sledging in an abusive manner was not 'authentic to being a New Zealander'. Ex-New Zealand captain Daniel Vettori has said that 'being nice suits Kiwi style', also claiming that he was never sledged by the Australians.

Following the 2015 World Cup Final between New Zealand and Australia which saw Australian wicketkeeper Brad Haddin engage in 'repeated sledging', the former publicly repudiated sledging. New Zealand cricketer Grant Elliott, who was among those targeted by Australian cricketers during the 2015 World Cup Final, commented: "You should sort cricket issues out with bat or ball, not with your mouth."

New Zealand captain Kane Williamson has been described as a 'great example for kids' by Adam Parore. Williamson was awarded the ICC Spirit of Cricket Award in 2018 with the ICC describing his behavior as 'outstanding'.

New Zealand women's captain Sophie Devine stated that sledging in women's cricket is not commonplace but it is 'witty and funny' whenever it occurs.

Pakistan 

Pakistani cricketer Imran Khan has mentioned that his players 'learnt' aggression during Pakistan's 1972-73 tour of Australia. Khan specifically mentioned Sarfaraz Nawaz among the players that 'picked up sledging' from the Australians. In 1999, the Pakistan Cricket Board lodged an official complaint to its Australian counterpart over 'persistent sledging' and the use of 'highly abusive language' against Pakistani players. Before Pakistan's Tour of Australia in 2004, then Pakistani captain Inzamam-ul-Haq made it clear that his players will 'give what they get' if subjected to sledging. Pakistani paceman Wasim Akram has emphasised that what is said on the field should remain on the field.

South Africa 
South African wicketkeeper-batsman Mark Boucher exclaimed that sledging 'will never completely leave the game.' South African skipper Faf Du Plessis remarked that "If showing aggression is considered a breach of conduct, we could rather have bowling machines bowl to a batsman."

Sri Lanka 
The Sri Lankan Cricket Team has had a reputation of avoiding verbal aggression. Former Sri Lankan captain Arjuna Ranatunga called for a ban on sledging in early 2008 with particular reference to Australia's interactions with touring sides. Former Sri Lankan wicketkeeper Kumar Sangakkara drew a clear distinction between aggression 'on the field' and verbal sledging, remarking that the two are different from each other.

West Indies 
The West Indies Cricket Team was famous in having a fearsome pace bowling attack during the 1980s, but rarely indulged in verbal intimidation of the opposition unless provoked. West Indies great Viv Richards said that his reaction to sledging was 'confrontational'. According to Richards, sledging is an 'inevitable part' of modern-day cricket. He further expounds that 'racial' slurring translates to crossing the line, comparing it to 'being hit in the nuts' and asserting that it is entirely unacceptable. Former West Indies wicketkeeper Deryck Murray has said that there is no room for sledging based around someone's 'race' or 'family background', adding that sledging directed towards West Indies players, particularly by Australians, during his career was sometimes 'beyond acceptable'. West Indies legend Curtly Ambrose has simply said: "I despise players who sledge. Sledging is very childish and beneath contempt."

Recorded sledging incidents

Till 1999

2000-2009

2010-2019

2020-current

See also

 The dozens
 Fighting words
 Smack talk
 Trash talk
 Insult comedy

References

External links
 
 Lighter examples of sledging – BBC Sport
 The Age – Warne Sledge
 Sledging part of Latham's cricket days – The Melbourne Age
 The Corridor's sledging page 
 Greatest Cricket Sledges

Cricket controversies
Cricket culture